Ellen Ruppel Shell (born 1952) is a correspondent for The Atlantic Monthly, and professor of science journalism.

Biography
Shell was born in Auburn, New York, United States. In 1974, Shell received a B.A. degree from the University of Rochester.

Shell's work tends to focus on the intersection of science and society with a special emphasis on medical policy, and she also writes on the politics of science, science and the media, and environmental policy.

Works
Shell is the author of four books:
A Child's Place: a year in the life of a day care center  (Little, Brown, 1992)
The Hungry Gene: the science of fat and the future of thin (New York : Atlantic Monthly Press, 2002)
Cheap: The High Cost of Discount Culture (New York : Penguin Books, 2009)
The Job: Work and Its Future in a Time of Radical Change (New York : Crown Publishing Group, 2018)

References

External links
Faculty of Boston University's Master's Degree Program in Science and Medical Journalism
Official site
Review of Cheap
Review of "The Job" -- Washington Post

American women journalists
1952 births
Living people
University of Rochester alumni
Boston University faculty
People from Auburn, New York
Journalists from New York (state)
20th-century American journalists
20th-century American women
American women academics
21st-century American women